Gilles Bernier (born July 15, 1934) is a former Canadian politician and diplomat. He was the Member of Parliament representing the riding of Beauce from 1984 to 1997, initially as a Progressive Conservative and later as an Independent. He later served as Canada's ambassador to Haiti from 1997 to 2001.

Life and career
Bernier was born in Montreal, Quebec, the son of Annette (Letourneau) and Amedee Bernier. Bernier moved to the Beauce in 1953 to pursue a radio career at CKRB in Saint-Georges-de-Beauce, and quickly became a local celebrity. Capitalizing on his popularity, he decided to go into politics in the 1984 election. He served two terms as a Tory but was forced to run as an independent in the 1993 election after Kim Campbell barred him from running under the PC banner due to fraud charges, of which he was later acquitted.

In 1997, Jean Chrétien named him ambassador to Haiti, and Liberal candidate Claude Drouin succeeded him in the 1997 election.

Bernier's son, Maxime Bernier, won the riding in turn from Drouin in the 2006 federal election, as a candidate of the merged Conservative Party of Canada. Maxime Bernier would serve as Minister of Industry and Minister of Foreign Affairs before resigning from the cabinet in 2008.

Electoral record

References

External links 

1934 births
Living people
Canadian radio hosts
Members of the House of Commons of Canada from Quebec
Progressive Conservative Party of Canada MPs
Independent MPs in the Canadian House of Commons
Ambassadors of Canada to Haiti
People from Saint-Georges, Quebec
Politicians from Montreal
Politicians affected by a party expulsion process